In aviation, a preflight checklist is a list of tasks that should be performed by pilots and aircrew prior to takeoff. Its purpose is to improve flight safety by ensuring that no important tasks are forgotten. Failure to correctly conduct a preflight check using a checklist is a major contributing factor to aircraft accidents.

History
According to researcher and writer Atul Gawande, the concept of a pre-flight checklist was first introduced by management and engineers at the Boeing Company following the 1935 crash of the prototype Boeing B-17 (then known as the Model 299) at Wright Field in Dayton, Ohio, killing both pilots. Investigation found that the pilots had forgotten to disengage the crucial gust locks (devices which stop control surfaces moving in the wind while parked) prior to take-off. Life magazine published the resulting lengthy and detailed B-17 checklist in its 24 August 1942 issue.

Crashes attributed to checklist failures
 On December 26, 1968, Pan Am Flight 799 (registration N799PA), a cargo flight in a Boeing 707-321C, crashed in Alaska immediately after departing, killing all three on board. Flaps were not in the proper takeoff position, partly as the result of distractions while following their taxi checklist. Despite the flap position being an important setting for takeoff, it did not appear on the Pan American pre-takeoff checklist.
 On May 26, 1987, a Continental Express flight, operated by Air New Orleans as flight 2962 (registration N331CY), crash landed just after takeoff from New Orleans International Airport. The plane crashed into eight lanes of traffic and subsequently injured two persons on the ground. Of the 11 occupants on board, there were zero fatalities. The NTSB cited "a breakdown of the crew coordination which resulted in their failure to comply with the Before Takeoff Checklist", noting the crewmembers lack of experience in the BAe-3101, and that they had attempted to use procedures that would have been correct in other aircraft they had flown.
 On August 16, 1987, Northwest Airlines Flight 255, a MD-82, crashed shortly after takeoff, killing 154 of 155 on board and two on the ground. The NTSB said "the probable cause of the accident was the flightcrew's failure to use the taxi checklist".
 Following a checklist would have  shown that the gust lock was engaged on the Gulfstream IV crash on May 31, 2014. The National Transportation Safety Board downloaded data from the aircraft's recorder and found it was a habit: 98% of the previous 175 takeoffs were made with incomplete flight-control checks. The National Business Aviation Association analyzed 143,756 flights in 2013-2015 by 379 business aircraft and only partial flight-control checks were done before 15.6% of the takeoffs and no checks at all on 2.03% of the flights.

FAR 121
The FAA's Federal Aviation Regulations explicitly requires a checklist for Federal Aviation Regulations, Part 121 operators (scheduled air carriers):

References

Further reading
 
 

Aviation-related lists
Checklists
Aviation publications